Akustichesky Albom (lit. Acoustic Album) is an album of the Russian rock group "Korol i Shut", released in 1999. At the core of the album is poured acoustic music, most of the songs on the theme of love lyrics.

Track listing
Kukla Kolduna (Sorcerer's Puppet) 3:23
Nablyudatel (The Spectator) 4:44
Bednyazhka (Poor) 4:10
Prygnu so Skaly (Jump Off a Cliff) 3:12
Devushka i Graf (The Girl and The Count) 4:33
Pesnya Mushketyorov (Song of Musketeers) 3:48
Tyani! (Pull on!) 2:56
Utrenny Rassvet (Morning Dawn) 2:29
Sosiska (Sausage) 2:12
Karapuz (Little Fellow) 2:34
Spyatil Otets (Father gone crazy) 3:30
Vedma i Osyol (The Witch and the Donkey)	2:57
Yekaterina 2:13
Prervannaya Lyubov (Interrupted Love) 2:57
Mototsikl (Motorcycle) 2:10
Golye Koki (Naked Balls) 2:39
Zabytye Botinki (Left Boots) 2:46

References
Album on the Official site

1996 albums
Korol i Shut albums